Dženan Hošić (born 13 March 1976) is a Bosnian professional football manager and former player.

International career
Hošić made his debut for Bosnia and Herzegovina in a March 2000 friendly match away against Jordan. It remained his sole international appearance.

Managerial statistics

Honours

Player
Sarajevo
First League of Bosnia and Herzegovina: 1998–99
Bosnian Cup: 1997–98
Bosnian Supercup: 1997

References

External links

1976 births
Living people
Footballers from Sarajevo
Association football defenders
Bosnia and Herzegovina footballers
Bosnia and Herzegovina international footballers
FK Sarajevo players
FC Anzhi Makhachkala players
Szczakowianka Jaworzno players
Zagłębie Sosnowiec players
FK Velež Mostar players
Premier League of Bosnia and Herzegovina players
Russian Premier League players
I liga players
Ekstraklasa players
Bosnia and Herzegovina expatriate footballers
Expatriate footballers in Russia
Bosnia and Herzegovina expatriate sportspeople in Russia
Expatriate footballers in Poland
Bosnia and Herzegovina expatriate sportspeople in Poland
Bosnia and Herzegovina football managers
FK Famos Hrasnica managers
FK Goražde managers
NK Vis Simm-Bau managers
NK GOŠK Gabela managers